Elliott Bay Marina is a private marina located in Seattle, Washington. It opened in 1991, after 17 years in the planning and permit process. There are 1,200 slips available for moorage.  There is a stationary pumpout located on the fuel dock.  The facility also has a Porta-Potty dump station.

The slips range in size from 32 to 63 feet with 52% of the boats between 36 and 50 feet LOA. The boat types are evenly split between sailboats and powerboats, which reflects the great sailing conditions on Puget Sound. Forty boats are liveaboards. Another 60 slips must remain available for transient boaters per agreement with the city.

The marina hosts the Downtown Sailing Series on Thursday nights during the summer.

Marine Services 
Gasoline and diesel fuel can be purchased on site. Over night moorage is available for a fee. There are 1250 guest moorage slips available. The total estimated guest boat capacity is 1280.  Electrical hook up is available for a fee. Electrical power is available in 30, 50, and 100 amps. It has been reported the minimum depth at mean low tide is 30.

New and used boat sales. The Seattle Yacht Club has an outstation and clubhouse in this marina. Repair services available at Elliott Bay are for light maintenance only. Other services include a fuel dock, pumpout, laundry, and grocery store.

Environmental improvements 
There are three aspects to Elliott Bay Marina's environmental improvements: the temporary steps taken during construction to reduce or ease the negative impacts on marine life; physical features built into the marina to enhance, protect, and encourage marine life; and operational practices that control pollutants or prevent them from entering the water:
 Habitat and water assessment
 Hazardous waste program
 Dog waste collection
 Education

Other environmental enhancements
The 900-car parking lot was built with a series of storm water drains and traps for separating petroleum from the runoff. More than 500 trees, 6,000 shrubs, and wide lawns were planted to act as runoff buffers, control erosion, and beautify the area. The marina fuel dock was designed with double-walled tanks and fuel lines, all equipped with monitors, sensors, and automatic shutoff should a leak occur. Oil booms, spill containment kits, and an aluminum pontoon boat are at the ready should a spill occur in the marina, or to head off one that is drifting in from nearby commercial shipping piers.

References

External links

 

Marinas in Washington (state)
Ports and harbors of Washington (state)
Water transport in Seattle
Magnolia, Seattle
1991 establishments in Washington (state)